Penhill Preceptory was a priory on the northern flanks of Penhill in Wensleydale, North Yorkshire, England, which functioned from about 1142 to 1308–12.

References

External links 

Monasteries in North Yorkshire
Wensleydale